Jung Il-woo (born 9 September 1987) is a South Korean actor. He is best known for his roles in the sitcom Unstoppable High Kick (2006), and the television dramas The Return of Iljimae (2009), 49 Days (2011), Cool Guys, Hot Ramen (2011), Moon Embracing the Sun (2012), and Cinderella with Four Knights (2016).

Early life 
The son of a former television news anchorman, Jung Il-woo studied Broadcasting at the Seoul Institute of the Arts, then later dropped out and transferred to the Theater and Film department of Hanyang University, graduating on 20 February 2014.

Career

2006–2010: Beginnings and rising popularity
Jung made his acting debut in 2006 with a minor role in the thriller The World of Silence, but he first rose to fame playing a rebellious teen and motorcycle fanatic with a crush on his teacher in daytime family sitcom Unstoppable High Kick. He then joined the ensemble cast of 2007 romantic comedy film My Love.

In 2009, Jung starred in his first leading role as a young warrior battling injustice in historical drama The Return of Iljimae. This was followed by a supporting role in  romantic comedy My Fair Lady, as an idealistic, upper-class lawyer. He further challenged himself when he made his stage debut in 2010 as an HIV-positive gay man in the sold-out play Beautiful Sunday, written by Japanese playwright Mayumi Nakatani.

2011–present: Breakout and overseas popularity
Jung's breakout role was in 2011 tearjerker 49 Days, in which he portrayed the Scheduler, a witty modern-day Grim Reaper. His popularity increased with his leading man turn in 2011 cable romantic comedy Cool Guys, Hot Ramen, in which he played an arrogant, immature yet lovable chaebol heir. A supporting role in hit 2012 historical drama Moon Embracing the Sun followed; Jung played a prince who becomes his half-brother's rival in love and for the throne.

Following the success of Cool Guys, Hot Ramen and Moon Embracing the Sun, Jung was launched to stardom as a Hallyu star. He won the Asia Male Actor award at Beijing's Huading Awards, the first non-Chinese entertainer to be nominated at the awards show since it began in 2005.

From 2013 to 2014, he played a prosecutor who falls in love with a girl from a family of orphans in Golden Rainbow. This was followed by a leading role as a prince turned ghost-seeing night watchman who patrols the palace after curfew and keeps the king and his citizens safe, in the supernatural period drama Diary of a Night Watchman.

In 2015, Jung starred in the Korean-Chinese web drama High-End Crush opposite Jin Se-yeon. In less than a month, the drama series recorded over 200 million views. Jung then starred in the Chinese romantic comedy film Rise of a Tomboy, where he plays the CEO of an IT firm who helps a girl develop a love formula for a mobile app.

In January 2016, Jung signed with a new management agency, HB Entertainment. Jung made his return to Korean television in tvN's romantic comedy Cinderella with Four Knights, playing a lonely and wild-child rebel who is not yet used to being a member of a rich family, having lived most of his life as an orphan.

In 2017, Jung starred in Gon Rak Game Ma Ya (also known as Love and Lies), making him the first Korean actor to land a leading role in a Thailand drama. The drama emerged as a local sensation, and led to a rise of popularity for Jung in the country.

In 2019, Jung starred in the historical action drama Haechi. This marks his first project after enlistment.

In 2021, Jung played the lead role in the MBN historical drama Bossam: Steal the Fate.

In 2022, Jung joins the ENA drama Good Job, which is the second reunion with Kwon Yu-ri, and returns to the big screen with the film Highway Family, which is slated for release in November.

In February 2023, he attended the Milan Fashion Week 2023 FW collection Onitsuka Tiger fashion show.

Personal life
Jung is close friends with fellow actors Lee Min-ho and Kim Bum. Jung is a practicing Roman Catholic.

Car Accident 
In August 2006, Jung sustained injuries in a serious car accident while riding in the back of a car with childhood friend and fellow actor Lee Min-ho, who was badly injured in the accident. Their two friends riding in the front of the car did not survive. Jung was left with partial memory loss, causing him to forget parts of his past. He notes that he remembers things, such as people's faces, but not necessarily where they met, and therefore uses photographs to help him remember.

Military enlistment 
In November 2016, he was diagnosed with a cerebral aneurysm. Although this would have exempted him from his mandatory military service, Jung enlisted in December 2016. Jung was discharged on November 30, 2018.

On February 3, 2022, it was confirmed that Jung tested positive for COVID-19, while he had finished the third dose of the vaccine. Jung was contacted by a staff member after filming for SNL Korea Season 2 on January 30 to 31, 2022.

Filmography

Film

Television series

Web series

Television shows

Web shows

Music video appearances

Hosting

Theater

Discography

Singles

Social activities

Awards and nominations

References

External links

 

1987 births
Living people
South Korean male film actors
South Korean male television actors
South Korean Roman Catholics
Male actors from Seoul
MAMA Award winners
Hanyang University alumni